The discography of Suicidal Tendencies, an American crossover thrash band formed in 1980 by vocalist Mike Muir, consists of thirteen studio albums, four compilation albums, two extended plays, twenty-one singles and twenty-two music videos. Their first studio album, Suicidal Tendencies, was released in 1983 but failed to chart. Their second album, Join the Army, was released four years later and peaked at number 100 in the United States and number 81 in the UK. The album caught the attention of Epic Records, who signed Suicidal Tendencies in 1988. The band released their first album for the label, How Will I Laugh Tomorrow When I Can't Even Smile Today, in September 1988, and in the following year they released Controlled by Hatred/Feel Like Shit... Déjà Vu, which was their first album to be certified gold by the Recording Industry Association of America (RIAA).

Suicidal Tendencies released their fifth album Lights...Camera...Revolution! in July 1990, which peaked at number 101 on the Billboard 200 and number 59 in the UK. It spawned four singles, including "Send Me Your Money", which peaked at number 83 in the UK, leading the album to sell over half a million copies. Their sixth album, The Art of Rebellion, was released in 1992 and peaked at number 52, their highest chart position in their home country to date. It was also the first of five Suicidal Tendencies albums to chart in Germany, as well as their only album to chart in Canada and New Zealand. Four singles were released to promote The Art of Rebellion, including "Nobody Hears" and "I'll Hate You Better", which peaked at number 28 and 34 respectively on the Billboard Mainstream Rock chart. After releasing Still Cyco After All These Years (1993), a re-recording of their first album, Suicidal Tendencies released their eighth studio album Suicidal for Life in 1994. Despite being the band's second highest-charting album in the US, peaking at #82, Suicidal for Life was not as successful as their previous releases, and eventually after touring in support of it, Suicidal Tendencies broke up.

Suicidal Tendencies reformed in 1996, and the compilation album Prime Cuts and split album Friends & Family, Vol. 1 were both released in the following year. They released one EP in 1998, which was followed by Freedumb (1999), their first studio album in five years. After the release of their next album, Free Your Soul and Save My Mind, in 2000, Suicidal Tendencies went on hiatus again and would not release their next studio album until No Mercy Fool!/The Suicidal Family in 2010, which contains mostly re-recordings of Suicidal Tendencies and No Mercy songs. No Mercy Fool!/The Suicidal Family was followed three years later by 13 (2013), which became Suicidal Tendencies' first album to chart on the Billboard 200 since Suicidal for Life but peaked at number 187, making it their second lowest chart position to date. The band's next studio album, World Gone Mad, was released on September 30, 2016, and received their lowest chart position to date on the Billboard 200, peaking at number 192. This was album was followed in 2018 by two releases: one EP (Get Your Fight On!) and an album featuring re-recorded and unreleased material (Still Cyco Punk After All These Years).

Albums

Studio albums

Notes

A. Controlled by Hatred/Feel Like Shit... Déjà Vu has been referred to as either an EP or a compilation album containing previously released or unreleased material, but is still considered a studio album.
B. Still Cyco After All These Years is a re-recording of the self-titled debut album, also includes one unreleased track and re-recordings of 2 songs from Join the Army
C. No Mercy Fool!/The Suicidal Family is a re-recording of songs from Join the Army and No Mercy:  Widespread Bloodshed / Love Runs Red with 3 other songs.
D. Still Cyco Punk After All These Years is a near-complete re-recording of frontman Mike "Cyco Miko" Muir's 1996 solo debut album Lost My Brain! (Once Again), also includes one unreleased track.

Compilation albums

Extended plays

Singles

Videos

Video albums

Music videos

References

Discography
Discographies of American artists
Heavy metal group discographies
Punk rock group discographies